Beethoven's sonatas may refer to:

Beethoven's piano sonatas
Beethoven's cello sonatas (disambiguation)
Beethoven's violin sonatas (disambiguation)